Sir Henry William Gore-Booth, 5th Baronet (1 July 1843 – 13 January 1900), was a notable Arctic explorer, adventurer and landowner from Lissadell House, Sligo, Ireland.

Antecedents
The Gore Baronetcy, of Artarman in the County of Sligo, was created in the Baronetage of Ireland on 30 August 1760 for Booth Gore. His father, Sir Robert Gore-Booth, 4th Baronet was an Anglo-Irish landowner who according to some sources was accused of evicting his starving tenant farmers during the period of the Great Irish famine and of packing them into coffin ships to emigrate. In contrast, other reports state that he mortgaged his estates and assisted his tenants by both providing them with food and refusing to accept any rents during the famine.

Life and adventures
Sir Henry enjoyed a much better relationship with the tenants on his 32,000 acre (12,950 ha) estate and he was seen as a "progressive landlord". Sir Henry was not involved in public affairs and was interested in the development of his estate, the welfare of his tenants and served both as the president of the Sligo Agricultural Society and the chairman of the Sligo, Leitrim and Northern Counties Railway. He was appointed High Sheriff of Sligo for 1872, and was a deputy lieutenant and justice of the peace for Sligo.

During his Arctic expeditions, Sir Henry was involved in the rescue of a fellow Arctic explorer called Benjamin Leigh Smith in 1882. Sir Henry was also a prolific writer on a variety of topics including Arctic exploration, yachting, whaling, polar bear hunting and shark fishing. He sailed his own yacht to the Arctic. He also hunted big game in Africa.

Much of his Arctic memorabilia is now on display in The Billiard Room of the now refurbished Lissadell House.

Sir Henry died at St. Moritz, Switzerland, on 13 January 1900, the cause of death being an attack of influenza.

Family
Sir Henry married, in 1867, Georgina May Hill of Tickhill Castle, Yorkshire, England, daughter of Colonel Hill and a niece of the Earl of Scarbrough. They lived at Lissadell House, Drumcliffe, County Sligo and were visited frequently by a childhood friend, the poet W. B. Yeats. The eldest son, Josslyn Augustus Richard Gore-Booth succeeded to the title. The two daughters Constance and Eva were both prominent political activists.
Eva became involved in the labour movement and women's suffrage in England and Constance became a Sinn Féin politician, revolutionary, Irish nationalist and suffragette. Constance, more commonly known as Countess Markievicz was the first woman elected to the British House of Commons, although along with the other Sinn Féin MPs she did not take her seat, and set up the first Dáil Éireann.  She was also the first woman in Europe to hold a cabinet position (Minister of Labour of the Irish Republic, 1919–1922).

References

1843 births
1900 deaths
People from County Sligo
Baronets in the Baronetage of Ireland
Explorers of the Arctic
Henry
High Sheriffs of County Sligo